The 1923 North Dakota Flickertails football team, also known as the Nodaks, was an American football team that represented the University of North Dakota as a member of the North Central Conference (NCC) during the 1923 college football season. In their fifth year under head coach Paul J. Davis, the Flickertails compiled a 5–3 record (2–1 against NCC opponents), finished in second place out of eight teams in the NCC, and outscored opponents by a total of 157 to 92. The team played its home games at the University field.

Schedule

References

North Dakota
North Dakota Fighting Hawks football seasons
North Dakota Flickertails football